The Calamba Bayside National High School is located in Calamba, Laguna, Philippines. It was established in 1989 as the Lingga Rural High School.

References

External links
 Official site

High schools in Laguna (province)
Schools in Calamba, Laguna